Phillip James Harrison (born 27 July 1961) is a former Australian rules footballer who played with Geelong in the Victorian Football League (VFL). He also played for North Adelaide and Port Adelaide in the South Australian National Football League (SANFL).

Harrison, a recruit from Numurkah in the Murray Football League, was a half back flanker in the Geelong reserves 1980, 1981 and 1982 premiership teams. He made seven senior appearances for the VFL club, two in 1981 and five in 1982.

In 1983, Harrison played in the SANFL for North Adelaide.

He moved to Port Adelaide for the 1984 season and remained there until 1989, when he retired with a second successive premiership.

From 1990 to 1992, Harrison captain-coached Millicent in the Western Border Football League. Harrison was then captain-coach of Tantanoola in 1993. He coached Modbury from 2008 to 2010 and steered them to a division two premiership in his first year. In 2012 he coached Broadview.

References

1961 births
Australian rules footballers from Victoria (Australia)
Geelong Football Club players
North Adelaide Football Club players
Port Adelaide Football Club (SANFL) players
Port Adelaide Football Club players (all competitions)
Numurkah Football Club players
Living people